Stamp World London 90 was an international stamp exhibition held 3-13 May 1990 at the Alexandra Palace, London.

The exhibition celebrated the 150th anniversary of the introduction of adhesive postage stamps, the first two being the Uniform Penny Post and the Penny Black.  The centennial of this event occurred in 1940, and any celebration was overshadowed by the reality of World War II.  Commemorative stamps were issued by several countries coinciding with this exhibition.

Handstamp
Special handstamps were issued for each day of the exhibition for use on First Day Covers (FDC). 11 in total were issued:
  Opening day
  International day
  Aerophilatelic day
  Penny Black Day
  Youth Day
  Universal Postal Union day
  British Islands Day
  Philatelic Literature Day
  Postal History Day
 Thematic Day
 FIP Day

Palmares

The Grand Prix went to the following exhibits:

 Grand Prix d'Honneur: Christian Sundman (Finland) for "Finland: 1638-1885". 
 Grand Prix International: 'Batavia' (U.K.) for "South Africa: Triangular Issues of the Cape Of Good Hope".
 Grand Prix National: Hassan Shaida (U.K.) for "Queen Victoria: The Birth of The World's First Postage Stamps".

The FIP Medal was awarded to Gary S. Ryan for his monograph "The Cancellations of Hungarian Post Offices on the First Issue of Hungary 1867-1871".

References

Further reading

External links
Stamp World London 90 souvenirs

1990 in London
1990
May 1990 events in the United Kingdom
Alexandra Palace